Princess Lalla Asma of Morocco (born 29 September 1965, Rabat) is the second daughter and third eldest child of Hassan II of Morocco and his wife, Lalla Latifa Hammou.

Biography 
She was educated at the Royal College (Rabat).

Lalla Asma got married in a private ceremony to Khalid Bouchentouf on 5 November 1986, a businessman and General Director of S.E.V.A.M. (Société d’exploitation de verreries au Maroc). He is a son of Hajj Belyout Bouchentouf, mayor of Casablanca from 1976-1994. Their wedding was officially celebrated in Marrakesh on June 6, 7 and 8, 1987.

They have two children, a son and a daughter:

 Moulay Yazid Bouchentouf (born 25 July 1988).
 Lalla Nuhaila Bouchentouf (born 29 May 1992). She married Ali El Hajji on 14 February 2021 in Rabat.

Patronages
She is Honorary President in Morocco of:
 Society for the Protection of Animals Abroad (SPANA).
 Lalla Asma Foundation for Deaf Children.

Honours

National honours
 Knight Grand Cordon of the Order of the Throne.

Foreign honours
 Honorary Dame Grand Cross of the Royal Victorian Order (United Kingdom, 14 July 1987).
 Knight Grand Cross of the Order of Leopold II (Kingdom of Belgium, 5 October 2004).
 Knight Grand Cross of the Royal Order of Isabella the Catholic (Kingdom of Spain, 14 January 2005).

References

Links
"Lalla Asma"  by Fernando Orgamides, El País; retrieved 6 November 2010.

Moroccan princesses
1965 births
Living people
People from Rabat
Recipients of the Order of Isabella the Catholic
Knights Grand Cross of the Order of Isabella the Catholic
Moroccan businesspeople
Alumni of the Collège Royal (Rabat)
Recipients of the Grand Cross of the Order of Leopold II
Honorary Dames Grand Cross of the Royal Victorian Order
Daughters of kings